Callum John Styles (born 28 March 2000) is a professional footballer who plays as a midfielder for  club Millwall, on loan from Barnsley, and the Hungary national team.

Club career
Styles developed through the Burnley academy but failed to earn a professional contract and was released aged 16.

Bury
Styles joined League One club Bury and made his debut professional team in their final game of the season against Southend United on 8 May 2016. He came on as a 75th-minute substitute for Anthony Dudley as the team won 3–2. In making his debut, Styles became the first player born in the new millennium to make an appearance in the Football League. Bury were later deducted three points after it was found Styles was not properly registered when he made his debut.

Styles signed a professional contract with Bury on 21 February 2017, signing a two-and-a-half-year deal.

Barnsley

On 6 August 2018, Styles signed for League One club Barnsley for £500,000, signing a four-year contract, though returned to Bury on loan until the January transfer window. He made 21 appearances in all competitions for Bury before returning to his parent club.

Styles made his debut for Barnsley on 9 March 2019 as a substitute against Accrington Stanley, replacing Mamadou Thiam. He scored his first goal for the Tykes, netting away at Brentford on the final day of the following season, helping the Yorkshire outfit retain their Championship status.

Millwall
On deadline day, 1 September 2022, Styles signed a new contract at Barnsley until 2025 before joining Millwall on a season-long loan.

International career
Although born in England, Styles was also eligible to play international football for Ukraine and Hungary through his grandparents. On 14 March 2022, Styles was included in the Hungary squad for matches against Serbia and Northern Ireland. On 24 March 2022, Styles debuted in the Hungarian national team against Serbia at the Puskás Aréna. He entered the pitch as a substitute for Zsolt Nagy in the 70th minute.

On 27 September, he received the highest score (7.62 out of 10) for his performance by the voters of Nemzeti Sport in the 2022–23 UEFA Nations League A match against Italy national football team.

Personal life
In an interview with the BBC, Styles stated that in 2020, he had found out that his grandmother was Hungarian. Poya Asbaghi, former manager of Barnsley, said in an interview that it is a big honour for Styles to represent Hungary.

Career statistics

International

Honours
Bury
EFL League Two runner-up: 2018–19

References

External links

2000 births
Living people
Hungarian footballers
Hungary international footballers
English footballers
Bury F.C. players
Barnsley F.C. players
Millwall F.C. players
Association football forwards
English Football League players
Citizens of Hungary through descent
English people of Hungarian descent
English people of Ukrainian descent
Hungarian people of British descent
Hungarian people of Ukrainian descent